John Evan Seery is an American political theorist who specializes in the history of American political thought. He is the George Irving Thompson Memorial Professor of Government and Professor of Politics at Pomona College.

Early life and education
Seery attended Amherst College, graduating in 1980, and subsequently received his doctorate from the University of California, Berkeley.

Career
Seery began teaching at Pomona College in 1990. He is an advocate for the small liberal arts college model of higher education, and co-edited a book with Susan McWilliams on the topic. He has also written critiquing the growth of administrative bureaucracies in higher education.

Works

References

External links
Pomona College faculty page

American political scientists
American political philosophers
Amherst College alumni
Pomona College faculty
Living people
University of California, Berkeley alumni
Year of birth missing (living people)
Place of birth missing (living people)